Marc Craig Cohn (born July 5, 1959) is an American singer-songwriter and musician. He won the Grammy Award for Best New Artist in 1992. Cohn is best known for the song "Walking in Memphis" from his eponymous 1991 album, which was a Top 40 hit.

Biography

Early life and education
Cohn was born on July 5, 1959, in Cleveland, Ohio to a Jewish family. He graduated from Beachwood High School in Beachwood, Ohio, a Cleveland suburb. Cohn learned to play guitar and started writing songs when he was in junior high school, playing and singing with a local band called Doanbrook Hotel. While attending Oberlin College, he taught himself to play the piano. He transferred to UCLA and began to perform in Los Angeles-area coffeehouses.

Career
Cohn released his debut solo album, Marc Cohn, in February 1991. The album was successful due to the hit single "Walking in Memphis", which was nominated for Song of the Year and Best Pop Vocal at the 34th Annual Grammy Awards. The song is autobiographical and shares Cohn's experience visiting Memphis, Tennessee in 1985. "Walking in Memphis" reached number 13 in 1991 on the Billboard Hot 100. It is his only Top 40 hit.

Marc Cohn was certified gold by the RIAA in February 1992 and was certified platinum in 1996. The album featured two other charting singles: "Silver Thunderbird" and "True Companion". Cohn won the 1992 Grammy Award for Best New Artist.

In May 1993, Cohn released his second studio album, The Rainy Season, which included notable guest appearances by David Crosby, Graham Nash, and Bonnie Raitt. "Walk Through the World" (1993), the first song from that album, reached the Top 30 on Billboard's Adult Contemporary chart. Cohn released his third solo effort, Burning the Daze, in 1998. The compilation The Very Best of Marc Cohn was released in June 2006. 

Cohn's track "Dance Back from the Grave", from the album Join the Parade (October 2007), relates to the events of Hurricane Katrina and to the post-traumatic stress Cohn suffered after being shot in the head in an attempted carjacking in August 2005.

In 2010, Cohn returned with Listening Booth: 1970, a collection of cover songs that were originally released during the titular year. The album peaked at number 28 on the Billboard 200 album chart. In addition to crossing genres from rock to soul to folk and pop, it featured vocal performances from India.Arie, Jim Lauderdale, Aimee Mann, and Kristina Train. As of September 2018, Listening Booth: 1970--which peaked at number 28--was Cohn's highest-charting album.

Cohn released his first original song in more than seven years, "The Coldest Corner in the World", in 2014. The song was the title track for the documentary Tree Man. Cohn released the album Careful What You Dream: Lost Songs and Rarities in 2016 in celebration of the 25th anniversary of his platinum-selling debut album. Cohn simultaneously released a bonus album, Evolution of a Record, which featured never-before-heard songs and demos. In 2017, Cohn worked with William Bell on his Grammy Award-winning album This Is Where I Live. He co-wrote several tracks on the album, including the opener, "The Three Of Me". Cohn also collaborated with the Blind Boys of Alabama on their Grammy-nominated song "Let My Mother Live". 

In 2019, Cohn performed at Carnegie Hall at "The Music of Van Morrison" show, which benefited music education programs for the New York City school system. Other performers included Patti Smith, Glen Hansard, Bettye LaVette, Blind Boys of Alabama, and Josh Ritter. Cohn performed "Walking in Memphis" alongside Miley Cyrus at the 2019 Memphis in May Festival as part of the "More Together" Facebook campaign. "Walking in Memphis" was also the center of a national commercial for the "More Together" campaign. Cohn released Work to Do, a collaboration with the Blind Boys of Alabama, on August 9, 2019.

Personal life
Cohn married Jennifer George on May 20, 1988. Cohn and George had two children.

Cohn and ABC News journalist Elizabeth Vargas married on July 20, 2002. The pair met at the 1999 U.S. Open after Vargas sought an interview with Cohn's friend, Andre Agassi. They have two sons, Zachary (born January 31, 2003) and Samuel (born August 16, 2006). Cohn and Vargas divorced in 2014, days after Vargas came out of rehabilitation for alcoholism for a third time.

On August 7, 2005, Cohn was shot in the head during an attempted carjacking in Denver, Colorado, while on a concert tour with Suzanne Vega. The bullet "barely missed Cohn's eye and lodged near his skull." Cohn survived and was hospitalized for observation, but was released after eight hours. According to Cohn, "Doctors told me I was the luckiest unlucky guy they had met in a long, long time." A police spokesperson surmised that the car's windshield may have significantly impeded the bullet's force, and added: "Frankly, I can't tell you how he survived." The shooter was sentenced to 36 years in prison.

Awards
1991 American Music Awards – Nominated for Favorite New Artist – Adult Contemporary
1992 Grammy Awards – Winner for Best New Artist
1992 Grammy Awards – Nominated for Pop Male Vocalist for "Walking in Memphis"
1992 Grammy Awards – Nominated for Song of the Year for "Walking in Memphis"

Discography

Albums

Live albums

Compilation albums

Singles

EPs
Hi-Five: Marc Cohn (2005)

References

External links

Official website

1959 births
Living people
Musicians from Cleveland
American male singers
American shooting survivors
Jewish American musicians
Jewish singers
Atlantic Records artists
Grammy Award winners